Gelb is a German surname meaning "yellow" and a nickname for man with red hair in Yiddish. People with the surname Gelb or Gelbs include:
 Anne Gelb, American mathematician
 Arthur Gelb, former managing editor of The New York Times
 Bruce Gelb, American businessman and diplomat
 Howe Gelb, American musician
 Ignace Gelb (1907–1985), Polish American ancient historian
 Jan Gelb (1906-1978), American artist
 Jerry Gelb, actor, voice actor and voice casting professional
 Lawrence M. Gelb (1898–1980), American chemist
 Leslie H. Gelb (1937-2019), American correspondent 
 Michael H. Gelb, biochemist and professor at the University of Washington
 Michael J. Gelb, writer and trainer, specialising in personal development and corporate training seminars
 Peter Gelb (born 1953), American arts administrator
 Richard L. Gelb (1924–2004), American businessman
 Steve Gelbs (born 1987), American sports reporter